Laboratory Corporation of America Holdings, more commonly known as Labcorp, is an American healthcare company headquartered in Burlington, North Carolina. It operates one of the largest clinical laboratory networks in the world, with a United States network of 36 primary laboratories. Before a merger with National Health Laboratory in 1995, the company operated under the name Roche BioMedical. Labcorp performs its largest volume of specialty testing at its Center for Esoteric Testing in Burlington, North Carolina, where the company is headquartered. As of 2018, Labcorp processes 2.5 million lab tests weekly.

Labcorp was an early pioneer of genomic testing using polymerase chain reaction (PCR) technology, at its Center for Molecular Biology and Pathology in Research Triangle Park, North Carolina, where it also performs other molecular diagnostics. It also does oncology testing, human immunodeficiency virus (HIV) genotyping and phenotyping.

Labcorp also operates the National Genetics Institute, Inc. (NGI), in Los Angeles, California, which develops PCR testing methods.

Labcorp's ViroMed facility, originally in Minnetonka, Minnesota, until closing this site in 2013, is now housed in Burlington and performs real-time PCR microbial testing using laboratory-developed assays.

Labcorp also provides testing in Puerto Rico and, outside the United States, in three Canadian provinces.

In February 2022, Labcorp announced that it has entered into agreements with Ascension, one of the nation’s leading Catholic and non-profit health systems, to manage Ascension’s hospital-based laboratories in 10 states and purchase select assets of the health system’s outreach laboratory business.

Labcorp  utilizes a fleet of eight Pilatus PC-12 and a single Pilatus PC-24 aircraft on nightly runs from Burlington for use on the East Coast. Prior to the acquisition of PC-12 aircraft Labcorp utilized seven PA-31-350's.

History

Revlon
National Health Laboratories Incorporated began in 1978. The company was a national blood and pathology laboratory owned by the Revlon Health Care Group, and managed by Michael E. Lillig for seven years. Lillig had earlier been with Becton, Dickinson and Company. At National Health Laboratories, Inc. he grew annual sales of the company each year by 43%, with revenue reaching $12 million by the end of his tenure. Lillig then left to found several health-care companies, including  Syscor, Inc., Intelysis, Inc., Asterion, LLC and MetaCyte's 3DR in Louisville, Kentucky.

National Health Laboratories, Inc.
In 1988, National Health Laboratories became publicly traded on the NASDAQ exchange. Revlon retained 24% ownership of the common shares, for the next six years. Revlon had been a publicly traded company since the 1950s, as it was during most of its ownership of National Health Laboratories. But in 1985, Revlon had been taken over by Ronald Perelman.

Through early 1995, the National Health Laboratories principal executive offices were located at 4225 Executive Square, Suite 805, in La Jolla, California.

In 1989, the company generated revenue of about US$400 million, with about US$70 million in earnings.

In 1990, the company's revenues reached US$500 million, with over US$70 million in earnings. That year, the company began paying a cash dividend to shareholders.

In 1991, National Health Laboratories moved from the NASDAQ OTC exchange to the New York Stock Exchange, where it began to trade under the new ticker symbol NH. Up until that time the company had performed very well, including through the 1990-1991 recession. Its earnings peaked that year at almost US$90 million, and its stock price had risen from its low within the prior few years by several-fold.

However, beginning in 1991 the company became embroiled in Operation "Labscam," a nationwide crackdown on fraud in the health-care system, initiated by the U.S. Attorney's Office in San Diego, California. The charges were that the company and others routinely submitted false claims to the government health-care agencies Medicare and Medicaid for unnecessary tests which physicians had never ordered. In 1992, National Health Laboratories became the first of the companies to be prosecuted in the government operation.

In 1992, the company reported revenues of over US$720 million, however with earnings of only US$40 million. The small gain that year reflected a fourth quarter charge of US$80 million, which the company paid in a settlement agreement with state and federal governments related to the LABSCAM investigation. The total payments made by National Health Laboratories in the settlement came to US$111 million that year, and ultimately reached US$173 million.

In 1993, revenues were up to US$761 million, with new peak earnings of nearly US$113 million. By that time the company had 22 major laboratories. The stock price reached a new all-time high in 1993, which became the peak for the next couple of years, and the company was added to the S&P MidCap 400 list.

National Health Laboratories Holdings
On March 8, 1994, National Health Laboratories Inc. reorganized as a holding company, National Health Laboratories Holdings Inc.

By 1994, MacAndrews & Forbes Holdings Inc. owned the Revlon Holdings Group's former 24 percent of National Health Laboratories Holdings. That company was a distributor of licorice extract and chocolate, which had previously been taken over, along with Revlon, by Ronald Perelman in the 1980s.

On May 4, 1994, National Health Laboratories announced that it would acquire Allied Clinical Laboratories, Inc., of Nashville, Tennessee, reducing their takeover offer to $204 million after federal officials issued new subpoenas in an investigation of Medicare billing practices at Allied Clinical Laboratories Inc. In 1993, Allied generated revenues of US$163 million. The former president and CEO of Allied Clinical, Haywood D. Cochrane, Jr., then became Vice Chairman of National Health Laboratories. In order to complete the cash transaction, the company discontinued paying its dividend at that time.

By the end of 1994, the company had run into financial difficulty again, as it struggled through the economic soft landing that year. Its earnings dropped by over two-thirds, to only US$30 million. The stock never traded that year at more than half of its 1993 peak, and at its 1994 low, it was down by nearly two-thirds from the all-time high.

Laboratory Corporation of America Holdings

1990s
On April 28, 1995, National Health Laboratories Holdings Inc. merged with Roche Biomedical Laboratories, Inc., and changed its name to Laboratory Corporation of America Holdings. It began trading under its new ticker symbol LH. Shareholders of National Health Laboratories received 0.72 shares of the new company, plus $5.60 in cash, for a 50.1 percent interest in the new company. At the time, James R. Maher was president and Chief Executive Officer of National Health Laboratories. Following the merger, Maher relinquished those positions, and instead became Chairman of the new company, succeeding the financier Ronald O. Perelman in that position. Perelman received about US$100 million from the deal, which made the new company the largest blood-testing company in the United States.

The merged company created revenues of US$1.7billion. National Health Laboratories already held long-term debt of US$351million. Together with the Roche debt, the combined companies owed US$590million prior to the merger. Another US$288 million was added to help finance the payout to shareholders. By year-end 1995, the new company's total debt reached US$959million.

Roche Biomedical Laboratories had been created by and was a wholly owned subsidiary of Hoffmann-La Roche, Inc., the American arm of the Swiss medical conglomerate, Roche Holding, Limited. Before 1982, the core of Roche Biomedical Laboratories had been Biomedical Reference Laboratories, which dated from the late 1960s, and was  located in Burlington, North Carolina. That core company had become publicly traded in 1979. Hoffman-La Roche acquired it for US$163.5million in 1982 and then merged it with all of its laboratories, and incorporated the merged company that year as Roche Biomedical Laboratories, Inc. in Burlington. By the early 1990s, Roche Biomedical had become one of the largest clinical laboratory networks in the United States, with US$600million in sales.

By 1993 Roche Biomedical Laboratories had revenues of US$712million, with 17 major laboratories. Dr. James Powell was President of Roche Biomedical, and after the merger with National Health Laboratories he became president and CEO of the new company, Laboratory Corporation of America Holdings, which then relocated from La Jolla, California, to the Roche Biomedical headquarters in Burlington, North Carolina. Hoffmann-La Roche also contributed US$186.7 million in cash to the deal, and retained 49.9 interest in the new merged company.

By year-end 1995, the new Laboratory Corporation of America Holdings suffered a marginal loss of a few million dollars. The stock price dropped by almost half again through the year, to within 10% of its all-time low since going public six years earlier. By early the next year, it broke marginally below that level, and set a new all-time low.

In July 1998, Labcorp acquired the Michigan-based laboratory division of Universal Standard Healthcare (UHCI). Labcorp also acquired an equity position in Universal Standard Healthcare and has become UHCI's clinical laboratory long-term testing provider but terminated this agreement one year later.

2000s

In June 2000, Labcorp completed the acquisition of San Diego–based Pathology Medical Laboratories for an undisclosed amount.

In 2000, Labcorp generated revenues of US$1.9billion with over 18,000 employees.

In May 2001, Labcorp completed its acquisition of Path Lab Holdings Inc., the largest regional laboratory in New England, and just a few weeks later the acquisition of Minneapolis-based ViroMed Inc., specialized on clinical diagnostic testing in virology, molecular biology, serology, microbiology, mycology and mycobacteriology, as well as in tissue/eye bank testing, for an undisclosed amount.

In December 2001, Labcorp became the exclusive marketer for genomics and proteomics predictive cancer test products made by Myriad Genetics, Inc.

In May 2002, Labcorp announced the acquisition of all outstanding Shares of Canadian medical laboratory services company Dynacare Inc. for $480million in cash and own shares.

In January 2003, Labcorp acquired all of the outstanding shares of Dianon, a provider of anatomical pathology and oncology testing services, for $598 million in cash.

In 2005, Labcorp's revenues totaled $3.3 billion; in 2006, revenues were $3.6billion; and in 2007, revenues reached $4.1billion.

In March 2005, Labcorp announced the acquisition of all outstanding Shares of Esoterix, Inc., a leading provider of specialty reference testing, for approximately $150 million in cash from private equity firm Behrman Capital.

In November 2006, Labcorp acquired Litholink Corporation, a kidney stone analysis laboratory.

In December 2007, Labcorp acquired Tandem Labs, a Contract research organization specializing in advanced mass spectrometry, immunoanalytical support, pharmacokinetics, and pharmacodynamics, headquartered in Salt Lake City, UT for an undisclosed amount.

In June 2009, Labcorp acquired Monogram Biosciences, a diagnostic lab specializing in HIV resistance testing, headquartered in South San Francisco, CA, in a cash tender of $4.55 per share for approximately $155million including debt.

2010s

In May 2010, Labcorp acquired the assets of its Santa Ana, California-based rival Westcliff Medical Laboratory which had just filed a Chapter 11 bankruptcy action in federal court. The FTC challenged this acquisition but lost in court.

In September 2010, Labcorp announced the acquisition of Genzyme Genetics, formerly a division of Genzyme, with 9 testing laboratories and approximately 1900 employees, for $925 million in cash.

In June 2011, Labcorp acquired their Canadian central labs partner Clearstone from investment firm Czura Thornton for an undisclosed amount, thus adding Clearstone's global network of central laboratories, including sites in China, France, Singapore and Canada, and the central laboratory protocol management system APOLLO CLPM to their portfolio.

In November 2011, Labcorp completed the acquisition of more than 90% of the shares of DNA testing company Orchid Cellmark for $85 million but had to sell parts of Orchid's paternity business to DNA Diagnostics Center.

In May 2012, Labcorp Clinical Trials sold its European biological sampling kit building operation located in Hamburg to clinical supply chain solutions provider Marken.

In August 2012, Labcorp completed the acquisition of rival testing lab Medtox Scientific for $241 million.

In September 2013, Labcorp acquired MuirLab, the clinical laboratory outreach business from John Muir Health.

In October 2014, Labcorp announced it had entered into an agreement to acquire Covance Inc. for approximately $6.1billion. Just a few weeks later, Labcorp completed its $85.3million acquisition of LipoScience, a developer of diagnostic tests based on nuclear magnetic resonance technology measuring heart disease risk.

In December 2014, Labcorp announced the completion of its acquisition of Bode Technology Group, Inc., a provider of forensic DNA analysis, DNA collection products, and relationship testing, from SolutionPoint International, Inc. for an undisclosed amount.  Bode was described in 2019 as the largest DNA forensic testing company in the USA.

In October 2015, Labcorp announced the acquisition of Safe Foods International Holdings, LLC and its two operating companies, International Food Network and The National Food Laboratory for an undisclosed amount, thus expanding their capabilities in food and beverage product-development and product-integrity.

In March 2016, Labcorp completed the acquisition of Torrance, CA-based laboratory firm Pathology Inc., a provider of expertise in reproductive FDA donor testing as well as anatomic, molecular and digital pathology services, for an undisclosed amount.

In August 2016, Labcorp announced it would acquire Sequenom for $371 million including debt, thus expanding its reach overseas, especially in Europe and Asia.

In October 2016, Labcorp acquired ClearPath Diagnostics, a provider of laboratory diagnostic services in the Northeastern United States, from private equity firm Shore Capital Partners for an undisclosed amount.

In May 2017, Labcorp acquired the Pathology Associates Medical Laboratories in Spokane, Washington, from Providence Health & Services and Catholic Health Initiatives for an undisclosed sum.

In July 2017, Labcorp acquired the contract research organization (CRO) Chiltern for $1.2billion.

2020s
In March 2020, Labcorp received emergency use authorization from the FDA for a test for Severe acute respiratory syndrome coronavirus 2 to help mitigate the COVID-19 pandemic.

Labcorp is one of the six large commercial lab companies that are conducting most of the United States' coronavirus testing, along with ARUP, BioReference Laboratories, Mayo Clinic, Quest Diagnostics, and Sonic Healthcare. According to the American Clinical Laboratory Association, by April 1, together these laboratories had completed 807,000 COVID-19 tests.

In November 2021, the business announced it would acquire contract research organisation Toxikon. In December, the company announced it would acquire Personal Genome Diagnostics Inc. and its liquid biopsy and tissue-based genomic product.

In February 2022, Labcorp announced that it has entered into agreements with Ascension, one of the nation’s leading Catholic and nonprofit health systems, to manage Ascension's hospital-based laboratories in ten states and purchase select assets of the health system's outreach laboratory business.

Acquisition history

 Labcorp (Est as National Health Laboratories, Inc., 1978, then National Health Laboratories Holdings Inc., 1994)
 Labcorp
 Laboratory Corporation of America Holdings (Est 1995 through the merger of National Health Laboratories Holdings and Roche Biomedical Laboratories)
 National Health Laboratories Holdings Inc.(Merged 1995)
 Allied Clinical Laboratories, Inc. (Acq 1994)
 Roche Biomedical Laboratories, Inc. (Merged 1995)
 Universal Standard Healthcare (Acq 1998, Laboratory division)
 Pathology Medical Laboratories (Acq 2000)
 Path Lab Holdings Inc. (Acq 2001)
 ViroMed Inc. (Acq 2001)
 Dynacare (Acq 2003)
 Esoterix, Inc. (Acq 2005)
 Litholink Corporation (Acq 2006)
 Tandem Labs (Acq 2007)
 Monogram Biosciences (Acq 2009)
 Westcliff Medical Laboratory (Acq 2010)
 Genzyme Genetics (Acq 2010)
 Clearstone (Acq 2011)
 Orchid Cellmark (Acq 2011)
 Medtox Scientific (Acq 2012)
 MuirLab (Acq 2013)
 Covance Inc. (Acq 2014)
 Virtual Center Laboratory B.V. (Acq 2002)
 GFI Clinical Services (Acq 2005)
 Signet Laboratories, Inc. (Acq 2006)
 Medaxial (Acq 2014)
 Sciformix Corporation (Acq 2018)
 LipoScience (Acq 2014)
 Bode Technology Group, Inc. (Acq 2014)
 SolutionPoint International, Inc. (Acq 2014)
 Safe Foods International Holdings, LLC (Acq 2015)
 International Food Network
 The National Food Laboratory
 Pathology Inc. (Acq 2016)
 Sequenom (Acq 2016)
 ClearPath Diagnostics (Acq 2016)
 Pathology Associates Medical Laboratories (Acq 2017)
 Chiltern (Acq 2017)
 Toxikon (Acq 2021)
 Personal Genome Diagnostics (Acq 2021)

Incidents 
Labcorp has been criticized for its practice of paying the salaries of genetic counselors in hospitals and doctors' offices, which is perceived to be a possible conflict of interest.

In July 2018, Labcorp was hit with a ransomware attack.

Labcorp has been criticised over faulty paternity tests, many of which have gone to court. The most notable case was the 2005 false accusation of Washington hairdresser Andre Chreky, who had to spend $200,000 and years in court proving despite a false-positive test that he was not the father.

Labcorp has frequently been the subject of controversy and protest in the United Kingdom for its use of Animal Research models. Particularly at its site in Huntingdon, formerly Huntingdon Life Sciences.

Corporate governance 
, the Labcorp Board of Directors includes Garheng Kong.
In 1997 Roche owned 49.7% of Labcorp but sold all of their Labcorp stock until 2002.

Notable people
 

Mark Elliott Brecher, Retired Chief Medical Officer LabCorp, Emeritus Professor University of North Carolina
Brian Caveney, Chief Medical Officer (2019-)

References

External links
 

 Labcorp Profile at Wikinvest

Companies listed on the New York Stock Exchange
Health care companies established in 1978
Health care companies based in North Carolina
Life sciences industry
Burlington, North Carolina
1980s initial public offerings
American companies established in 1978